Greece women's national softball team is the national team for Greece.  The team competed at the 2006 ISF Women's World Championship in Beijing, China where they finished ninth.

References

External links 
 International Softball Federation

Women's national softball teams
Softball
Softball in Greece